The Malabar script is a Brahmic script used commonly to write the Malabari Malayalam or Mappila Malayalam. Like many other Indic scripts, it is an abugida, or a writing system that is partially “alphabetic” and partially syllable-based.

Overview
Malabar script is very similar to Malayalam script. However, some letters have different pronunciation. For example, വ (ba) in Malabar script is വ (va) in Malayalam script.

Brahmic scripts